Matt Waters is an American drama series which aired in 1996 on CBS. The program starred talk show host Montel Williams, and was created by James D. Parriott.  The show, which was a midseason replacement, failed to garner a significant audience and was canceled after just six episodes.

Williams played a retired naval officer who becomes a high school science teacher at Bayview High School, the school he had attended 25 years earlier. Williams's character had returned home after his brother was killed in a gang related murder. Portions of the program were filmed at Bayonne High School in Bayonne, New Jersey.

Cast
 Montel Williams as Matt Waters
 Kristen Wilson as Nicole Moore
 Sam McMurray as Charlie Sweet
 Richard Chevolleau as Flea Decker
 Nathaniel Marston as Jack Tisdale
 Felix A. Pire as Russ Achoa
 Cyndi Cartagena as Angela Perez
 Amy Hargreaves as Chloe Drescher

Episodes

References

External links
 

CBS original programming
1990s American high school television series
1990s American drama television series
1996 American television series debuts
1996 American television series endings
Television series about educators
Television shows set in New Jersey
Television shows filmed in New Jersey
English-language television shows
Television series by Sony Pictures Television